Iñigo González de Heredia Aranzábal (born 15 March 1971 in Gasteiz) is a Spanish former professional racing cyclist. He participated three times in a Grand Tour, but only finished the 1995 Vuelta a Espana, where he finished in 70th place.

Major results
1991
 3rd Vuelta a Zamora
1996
 1st  Time trial, National Road Championships
1997
 1st Stage 1b (TTT) Vuelta a La Rioja
1998
 1st Memorial Manuel Galera

References

External links

1971 births
Living people
Spanish male cyclists
Sportspeople from Vitoria-Gasteiz
Cyclists from the Basque Country (autonomous community)